WAEY is a Southern Gospel formatted broadcast radio station licensed to Princeton, West Virginia, serving Princeton and Mercer County, West Virginia.  WAEY is owned and operated by Princeton Broadcasting, Inc.

Translator
In addition to the main station, WAEY is relayed by an FM translator to widen its broadcast area.

References

External links

1947 establishments in West Virginia
Southern Gospel radio stations in the United States
Radio stations established in 1947
AEY